Aleš Kranjc (born July 29, 1981) is a Slovenian ice hockey player who plays for EV Lindau Islanders in the southern division of the 3rd tier German Oberliga. He participated at several IIHF World Championships as a member of the Slovenia men's national ice hockey team.

Career statistics

Regular season and playoffs

International

References

External links

 Profile at SiOL portal

1981 births
Living people
Fehérvár AV19 players
Motor České Budějovice players
HK Acroni Jesenice players
Ice hockey players at the 2014 Winter Olympics
Kölner Haie players
Olympic ice hockey players of Slovenia
Sportspeople from Jesenice, Jesenice
Slovenian ice hockey defencemen
Vienna Capitals players
Slovenian expatriate sportspeople in Austria
Slovenian expatriate sportspeople in the Czech Republic
Slovenian expatriate sportspeople in Germany
Ice hockey players at the 2018 Winter Olympics
HC Dynamo Pardubice players
Graz 99ers players
Södertälje SK players
HK Olimpija players
HDD Jesenice players
HC Kuban players
Rote Teufel Bad Nauheim players
ETC Crimmitschau players
Slovenian expatriate sportspeople in Sweden
Slovenian expatriate sportspeople in Russia
Expatriate ice hockey players in Austria
Expatriate ice hockey players in the Czech Republic
Expatriate ice hockey players in Germany
Expatriate ice hockey players in Sweden
Expatriate ice hockey players in Russia
Slovenian expatriate ice hockey people